Bertrand Benik Tequwa Bong (born March 27, 1987 in Yaoundé) is a Cameroonian professional footballer who last played as a striker for Sporting Clube de Goa in the I-League.

At the start of the 2012–13 I-League season, Bong signed for Sporting Clube de Goa from Al-Ahli.

References

1987 births
Living people
Cameroonian footballers
Al-Shamal SC players
Expatriate footballers in Oman
Cameroonian expatriate footballers
Expatriate footballers in Qatar
Canon Yaoundé players
Expatriate footballers in Egypt
Wadi Degla SC players
Footballers from Yaoundé
Cameroonian expatriate sportspeople in Qatar
Cameroonian expatriate sportspeople in Oman
Cameroonian expatriate sportspeople in Egypt
Ravan Baku FC players
Qatari Second Division players
Association football forwards
Cameroonian expatriate sportspeople in India
Expatriate footballers in India
Expatriate footballers in Bahrain
Expatriate footballers in Azerbaijan
Cameroonian expatriate sportspeople in Azerbaijan